The 91st Battalion (Elgin), CEF, was an infantry battalion of the Great War Canadian Expeditionary Force.

History 
The 91st Battalion was authorized on 22 December 1915 and embarked for Britain on 29 June 1915, where its personnel were absorbed by the 12th, 35th, 36th, 37th, 38th and 39th Reserve Battalion(s) on 15 July 1916 to provide reinforcements for the Canadian Corps in the field. The battalion disbanded on 21 May 1917.

The 91st Battalion recruited in the County of Elgin and was mobilized at St. Thomas, Ontario.

The 91st Battalion was commanded by Lt.-Col. W.J. Green from 28 June 1916 to 15 July 1916.

The 91st Battalion was awarded the battle honour THE GREAT WAR 1916.

Perpetuation 
The 91st Battalion (Elgin), CEF is perpetuated by 31 Combat Engineer Regiment (The Elgins).

See also 

 List of infantry battalions in the Canadian Expeditionary Force

References

Sources
Canadian Expeditionary Force 1914–1919 by Col. G. W. L. Nicholson, CD, Queen's Printer, Ottawa, Ontario, 1962

091
Military units and formations of Ontario